Cody Maynard is an American politician who has served as the Oklahoma House of Representatives member from the 21st district since November 16, 2022.

Early life
Cody Maynard was born in 1986 at Gatesville, Texas and attended Gatesville Independent School District. In his youth, he also worked at Camp Koinonia.

Maynard later attended Abilene Christian University graduating within 2008 with a bachelor's degree in accounting and financial management and in 2009 with his master's degree in accounting. He became a  Certified public accountant in 2012.

Career
In 2009. Maynard joined Hendrick Healthcare System's accounting department 
In 2010, he moved to Durant, Oklahoma and began working for Victory Life Church. He was promoted in 2020 to "pastor of business administration" for the church.

Oklahoma House of Representatives
Maynard officially announced his campaign for the Oklahoma House of Representatives's 21st district in January 2022. The race to succeed term-limited incumbent Dustin Roberts drew three other candidates: Penny James, Dustin Reid and Ryan Williams. He was endorsed by Americans for Prosperity. 

Maynard advanced to an August runoff election with Dustin Reid. His campaign focused on his christianity and his Certified public accountant credentials and he was endorsed by Representatives Jay Steagall and Gerrid Kendrix.
Since no non-Republican candidates filed in the district, there was no November general election. Maynard won election and was sworn in on November 16, 2022.

Personal life
Maynard is married to his wife Crystal, with whom he has three children. He is also a member of the Durant Chamber of Commerce and the organizing Treasurer of the Trail Life USA Durant Troop Committee.

References

1986 births
21st-century American politicians
Abilene Christian University alumni
American accountants
American Protestants
Christians from Oklahoma
Living people
Republican Party members of the Oklahoma House of Representatives
People from Gatesville, Texas